Jody Vanessa Watley (born January 30, 1959) is an American singer, songwriter, record producer and artist, whose music crosses genres including pop, R&B, jazz, dance and electronic soul. During the late 1970s and early 1980s she was a member of the r&b/funk band Shalamar, who scored many hits, notably so in the UK. In 1988, she won the Grammy Award for Best New Artist (as a solo artist) and has been nominated for three Grammy awards.

In 2008, she was the recipient of a Lifetime Achievement Award from Billboard magazine, and was also prominently featured in the historic black issue of Vogue Italia in 2008.

In December 2016, Billboard ranked her as the 21st-most-successful dance artist of all time. and in 2017 Black Music Honors TV special recognized Watley as Crossover Music Icon Honoree for her groundbreaking achievements and influence.

In August 2018, Billboard ranked Jody Watley as one of the top female artists of all time, at number 53.

In March 2021, Jody Watley was named the First Ambassador of the National Museum of African American Music. 

In 2022, Jody Watley received an honorary doctorate in business and Presidential Lifetime Achievement Award from Joe Biden at Jody Watley Day at Georgia State Capitol, and was inducted into Women's Songwriters Hall Of Fame.

Youth and early career

1977–1983: Soul Train and Shalamar

Watley was born in Chicago, Illinois, United States. Watley made her first stage appearance at eight years old with family friend and godfather Jackie Wilson. She got her start on the TV dance show Soul Train at the age of 14. At Dorsey High School she was voted 'best dancer' in her senior class poll. Documented by Ebony magazine in 1977 as a part of "The New Generation," Jody Watley was one of the most popular dancers on the show and recognized as a trendsetter for her style and dance moves.
As standouts on the television show, Watley and fellow Soul Train dancer Jeffrey Daniel were selected to join Gary Mumford and become original members of the R&B group Shalamar by show creator Don Cornelius. (Mumford was shortly replaced by Gerald Brown, and Brown himself was soon replaced by Howard Hewett as lead vocalist.) The lineup of Hewett, Watley and Daniel would be the most successful. Watley remained with Shalamar from 1977 to 1983. The trio released several albums and scored several hits including the U.S. Top 20 "Dead Giveaway", and the R&B hits "The Second Time Around", "For the Lover In You" and "A Night to Remember". Because of conflicts within the group, disagreements about the artistic direction of Shalamar with Dick Griffey, and lack of payment from Solar Records, she finally left the group in 1983, prior to the release of The Look album.

Post-Shalamar in 1984, Watley moved to England, and while there she recorded a guest vocal with British Jamaican roots reggae group Musical Youth for their album, Different Style!. She also recorded with Gary Langan, Anne Dudley and J. J. Jeczalik (who later became Art of Noise). She had a brief stint with Phonogram Records where two singles were released (in the UK, Europe and Australia—though crucially not America) under the mononym 'Jody': "Where the Boys Are" and "Girls Night Out". Also during this era, and after departing the group, she took part in Bob Geldof's Band Aid recording of "Do They Know It's Christmas?", which included Bono, Boy George, Sting, George Michael, Phil Collins, Status Quo, Paul Weller, Bananarama and other prominent Irish and British artists.

Solo career

1987–1988: Jody Watley and commercial breakthrough

After two-and-a-half years in England, Watley returned to America and secured a recording deal with MCA Records, eager to establish her own identity. Her debut solo studio album, titled Jody Watley, was released in March 1987, and she co-wrote six of the album's nine songs with partner André Cymone, who also produced her first four albums. In an interview with Rolling Stone, Watley would say that she wanted to showcase her voice against "really funky hard dance tracks". The album's lead single, "Looking for a New Love", became a hit and was certified Gold by the Recording Industry Association of America (RIAA). The album peaked at number ten on the U.S. Billboard 200, number one on the Top R&B/Hip-Hop Albums chart, and sold two million copies in the United States and a total of four million copies worldwide. It produced five uptempo dance and R&B singles that charted on the Billboard Hot 100, with three peaking within the top ten: "Looking for a New Love" (#2), "Still a Thrill" (#56), "Don't You Want Me" (#6), "Some Kind of Lover" (#10) and "Most of All" (#60) Also included on her debut album was a duet with George Michael, "Learn to Say No", produced by Bernard Edwards of Chic fame.

At the 30th Annual Grammy Awards of 1988, Watley won the award for Best New Artist, and was nominated for Best Female R&B Vocal Performance. That same year, she also received nominations for two MTV Video Music Awards and three Soul Train Awards. After Shalamar she had two singles released under the name of 'Jody', without her last name even though adverts in UK pop magazine Smash Hits mentioned that she was "formerly of Shalamar". This "technicality" (no second name), allowed her controversially to be considered a "New Artist" at the Grammys, beating Breakfast Club, Cutting Crew, Terence Trent D'Arby and Swing Out Sister. Shortly after winning the Grammy, Watley would be featured in Harper's Bazaar magazine photographed by Francesco Scavullo.

1989–1990: Larger Than Life and continued success

In the spring of 1989, Watley released her second studio album, Larger Than Life, co-writing eleven of the album's twelve songs. The album sold over four million copies worldwide, reaching number 16 on the Billboard 200, and produced four singles: "Real Love" Certified Gold by RIAA (US #2, #1 R&B, #2 Dance, UK #31), a Gold-certificated single and her first Top 40 UK single since "Looking for a New Love" in 1987; "Friends" featuring Eric B. & Rakim (US #9, #3 R&B, #7 Dance, UK #21) was the first R&B, Pop, Rap, Dance collaboration to cross over Top 10 on multiple charts; and "Everything" (US #4, #3 R&B), her first ballad released as a single. The album's fourth and final single, "Precious Love", was a minor hit, peaking at number 87 on the Billboard Hot 100. "Friends" is notable for being the first multi-format hit single to include the formula of a pop star featuring a guest rapper with the custom full 16-bar verses and bridge concept, and distinguishable from the rap "Intro" by Melle Mel on Chaka Khan's notable cover of Prince's song "I Feel for You". The successful "Friends" formula would become a mainstay formula in commercial pop music and was added as a category at the Grammys under Grammy Award for Best Rap/Sung Collaboration in 2002.

During the summer of 1989, the "Real Love" video, directed by Hollywood director David Fincher, was nominated for seven MTV Video Music Awards including Breakthrough Video, Best Art Direction, Best Dance Video and Best Female Video at the 1989 ceremony. That record was held until Michael Jackson and Janet Jackson's video "Scream" received 11 VMA nominations in 1995. The next year, she was nominated for two Soul Train Awards, an NAACP Image Award for Outstanding Female Artist, and a Narm Award for Best Selling R&B Female Album. While riding high on her Larger Than Life World Tour, a remix album, titled You Wanna Dance with Me?, was released in October 1989 and achieved Gold status in America. 1989 also saw Watley featured in Harper's Bazaar "Ten Most Beautiful Women" issue, photographed by Matthew Rolston. That same year Watley appeared on the cover of the Japanese high-fashion magazine SPUR for its debut issue.
Watley released the million-selling "Dance to Fitness"—a first for an African-American woman and artist.

1991–1992: Affairs of the Heart and change in style

Watley would state that she was eager to change her musical range and image, and no longer wanted to be seen as just a dance diva.
She was inspired toward a more introspective approach for "Affairs Of The Heart", wanting to address social concerns. In December 1991, Watley released her third album, Affairs of the Heart, described by Justin Kantor in Guide to Soul as an overlooked standout of her 1980s and 1990s output. The album peaked at No. 124 on the U.S. chart, and #21 on the R&B/Hip-Hop Albums Chart.

The lead single, "I Want You," failed to crack the top 40, peaking at No. 61 on the Billboard Hot 100 chart, though peaking at No. 5 on the U.S. R&B singles chart, and #17 Dance. The second single, "I'm the One You Need", reached No. 3 Dance and peaked at No. 19 on the U.S. Hot 100. The final single was the ballad "It All Begins with You", her first single to miss the U.S. Hot 100. Watley earned an invitation by President George H. W. Bush in 1992 to perform this song at the White House. Watley used the opportunity to encourage the government to provide more support and funding for public schools. Watley recorded "It's All There" for the movie Switch with the composer Henry Mancini.

1993–1994: Intimacy

Apparently undeterred by disappointing sales, Watley stated she was more concerned with broadening her creative boundaries than in having huge record sales.
In November 1993, MCA released her fourth solo album, the introspective relationship-themed Intimacy. Noting that the new jack swing was popular in R&B at the time, Amy Linden wrote in People magazine that Intimacy continued the process of Watley's move toward more refreshingly adult themes and that Watley was deserving of serious attention. Watley herself said that the songs she wrote were always personal statements.

Intimacy with its songs of "romance and angst" reached No. 164 on the U.S. Top 200 Album Chart and No. 38 on the Top R&B/Hip-Hop Albums Chart. The first single was "Your Love Keeps Working On Me", barely scraped onto the Hot 100 at No. 100 and also peaked at No. 2 Dance and No. 26 R&B/Hip-Hop. Watley added video director to her résumé for the next single, the spoken-word tune "When a Man Loves a Woman". "When a Man Loves a Woman" reached No. 11 Hot R&B/Hip-Hop and U.S. No. 8 Dance. Although not a pop hit in the U.S. or UK as well, the BBG remix of this song topped the Dance charts in the UK. The album also contained the song "Ecstasy", produced by David Morales, which became an underground hit and later appeared on her Greatest Hits collection. Like its predecessor, "Intimacy" would not be a strong seller, but would continue to give Watley better critical success.

1995: Affection
Having parted ways with MCA Records, Watley took an independent path and started her own label, Avitone Records, and released her fifth studio album, Affection, in July 1995. The album was engineered and produced by the Booker T. Jones and Angelo Earl. She aligned Avitone with the independent Bellmark Records for distribution. According to a review of the album "Affection" by Jose Promis of AllMusic, the release lacked the urgency and immediency of her dance-era hits, but was an engaging collection of slow burners, mid-tempo and jazzy R&B. The album's title track, "Affection", didn't crack the Hot 100 but became a moderate R&B hit, peaking at No. 28 on the Hot R&B/Hip-Hop Singles & Tracks chart.

1996: Greatest Hits album
 In 1996, Watley played Rizzo in the musical Grease on Broadway theater in New York City, the first African-American woman to play the role. Watley was photographed by Victor Skrebneski for the Saks Fifth Avenue Defining Style Fall Catalog, where she appeared in a 15-page high-fashion layout. That fall, Watley appeared on the platinum-selling single "This Is For The Lover In You" by Babyface. The single also featured LL Cool J and Watley's former Shalamar bandmates Howard Hewett and Jeffrey Daniel, essentially reforming the group for the single. It was a remake of Shalamar's R&B hit "For the Lover In You". As the year wound to a close, Watley took a hiatus from her own Avitone label, and signed with Big Beat/Atlantic Records. The same year MCA Records released her Greatest Hits album with Watley's recordings for MCA.

1997–1998: Flower
After spending most of 1997 in the recording studio crafting her sixth studio album, Flower, Watley was back in early 1998 with its lead singles "Off the Hook" and "If I'm Not In Love". "Off The Hook" peaked at No. 23 on the Billboard R&B Singles Chart and No. 73 Billboard Hot 100 but fared much better on Billboard Hot Dance Music/Club Play chart. Propelled by remixes from Masters at Work and Soul Solution, the track reached No. 1 on the dance chart, making it her first No. 1 Hot Dance Music/Club Play hit in nine years. Later the same year, a single of "If I'm Not In Love" was released, with promo mixes by Sal Dano (credited as BK Dano), Lenny Bertoldo and 95 North (Richard Payton and Doug Smith) and that song reached No. 2 on the Hot Dance Music/Club Play chart. Big Beat Records was absorbed into its parent label, Atlantic Records, which then shelved the album from a U.S. release, and left Watley in legal limbo for two years. Flower was, however, released in Canada, the UK and Japan. The critically acclaimed release was championed by many British magazines, including Blues and Soul and Echoes among others.
A previously unreleased song featuring Watley with George Duke titled "Baby Love" was included as a bonus track on The Best of George Duke: The Electra Years in 1997.

1999: The Saturday Night Experience Volume 1
It was during the time she was unable to record, that Watley says she was inspired by 4Hero, whose 1998 album Two Pages exposed her to the underground electronic dance music outside of the mainstream; she credits this inspiration for not retiring after the disappointment of how Flower was handled.

In November 1999, Jody reactivated her independent label, Avitone, and released her seventh studio album via Universal Japan The Saturday Night Experience featuring Jody Watley Vol. 1, a collection of organic club music tracks, inspired by her newfound love of electronic music. It was released exclusively in Japan along with a single, "Another Chapter," with remixes by DJ Soma. Also included on the project was the drum and bass title song "Saturday Night Experience". As Watley told music historian David Nathan, "The Saturday Night Experience was intended to be a concept album, aimed at people looking for something different." Watley stated she had no desire to release the project in the U.S. The title song of the same name was licensed to Giant Step and included on their compilation "Giant Sessions, Volume 1 Mixed by Ron Trent". The following year, MCA released 20th Century Masters: The Millennium Collection: The Best of Jody Watley.

2001–2005: Midnight Lounge

In 2001, Jody released her eighth studio album, Midnight Lounge in Europe and Japan. In an interview with Billboard magazine Watley would say, "An artist should always explore new frontiers." "Midnight Lounge" was a collection of tracks that combined a blend of soul, jazz, R&B and electronic club music.

After achieving moderate success in its original release, Watley arranged for it to be released in the U.S. through her Avitone imprint in a short-term license deal with Shanachie Records on March 11, 2003. Midnight Lounge was Watley's first studio album released in the U.S. in eight years, reaching Top 20 status on the Billboard Top Electronic Albums chart. Roy Ayers appeared on the Masters at Work-produced "I Love to Love", and Junior Vasquez and several other producers contributed remixes to the single release of "Whenever", bringing the track to No. 19 on the Billboard Hot Dance/Club Play Chart. One of the album's other singles, "Photographs", became notable in the underground club scene with mixes by Phil Asher and East West Connection. The music and growth of Watley would achieve critical acclaim for the project and Watley, noting she had successfully updated her sound over the years and evolved successfully into a soulful chanteuse.

In 2005, Watley made history on the Billboard Hot Dance Music/Club Play Chart when she re-released her 1987 hit "Looking For a New Love" on Curvve Recordings. The 2005 remix reached No. 1 on the Billboard Dance/Club Play chart, making her the first artist ever to take the same song to No. 1 in two different decades. Jody Watley now has the distinction of being among the few artists who have been to No. 1 on Billboard Hot Dance Music/Club Play chart in all of the past three decades (the 1980s, 1990s and 2000s). The same year, Watley was invited to participate in the Force of Nature Relief Concert to aid the victims of the 2004 Indian Ocean earthquake. During the trip Watley and others (including the Black Eyed Peas, Lauryn Hill and Jackie Chan) were invited to the Royal Palace to meet the King and Queen of Malaysia for a special tea reception in showing their gratitude for all involved with Force of Nature.

2006–2014: The Makeover
The Makeover would bring Watley together with 4Hero and King Britt among others in an electronic musical style. Understanding the shifting paradigms in the music industry and the changing business models, Watley's Avitone Recordings arranged for The Makeover to be released exclusively to the Virgin Megastore chain in its first ever CD exclusive. It debuted at No. 1 for the retailer, and was accompanied by a Virgin mini-tour where she performed for customers and signed copies of the CD. The first single was a cover of Madonna's "Borderline". The single reached No. 2 on the Hot Dance Music/Club Play chart in January 2007. The second single, a cover of Chic's "I Want Your Love," reached No. 1 on the Hot Dance Music/Club Play in June 2007.

In 2007, Watley was listed as No. 5 in the Year-end Billboard Dance Play Artists. Her single "I Want Your Love" was No. 15 and "Borderline" No. 19 according to Billboard Year End Chart Review for 2007. In January 2008, "I Want Your Love" topped the UK Dance Charts in January, giving her first UK mainstream dance hit in two decades. In 2008, she launched an online music store, while scoring another Top Five Billboard Dance Single, "A Beautiful Life," bringing the total of Top Five Singles for The Makeover to three. In May 2008, continuing over a decade of support for various charities dedicated to raising funds and awareness for HIV and AIDS, Watley performed at Life Ball, Europe's largest gala for the cause held in Vienna, Austria. In May 2009, Watley's Avitone signed a distribution deal with London-based Alternative Distribution Alliance Global.

In October 2009, an "International" version of "The Makeover' was released in the UK to positive reviews. Pete Lewis from Blues & Soul noted her evolution as an artist and performer as being showcased on the album. Further stating Watley being hailed by some, as exemplifying the 21st-century recording artist continuing to exercise her own creative path. Distinguishable from the original release, The Makeover "International Edition" featured new cover art and track listing. New inclusions featured the bossa-soul rendering of Bob Marley's "Waiting in Vain", a sparsely arranged version of Carole King's 1960s ballad "Will You Still Love Me Tomorrow", Erasure's anthem "A Little Respect", and a reworking of the Diana Ross dance classic "Love Hangover". Replacing the downtempo ambient version found on the 2006 "The Makeover", Watley recorded the new arrangement originally suggested by songwriter Pam Sawyer, for Ross.
Reg Dancy from Basic Soul would write that Watley was able to handpick songs and make them seem as if they had been written for her.
Added to the line-up of producers which included King Britt, Mark de Clive-Lowe, 4Hero, DJ Spinna and longtime co-collaborator Rodney Lee, are remixer/producers Marco Zappala from Brazil and Craig C. from the UK.

In February 2010, Jody Watley joined Jamie Foxx onstage at a post-Grammy event for a duet performance of her signature hit "Looking For a New Love" and also appeared in the VH1 documentary Soul Train: The Hippest Trip In America. On October 27, 2012, Watley starred in the one time international humanitarian musical event Loving the Silent Tears with performers from 16 countries and cultures, created by Al Kasha, directed by Vincent Paterson and choreographed by Bonnie Story at The Shrine Auditorium in Los Angeles

Jody Watley recorded collaborations with the electro pop duo French Horn Rebellion on singles titled "Cold Enough" and "Dancing Out" also featuring Young Empires in December 2012 and June 2013. Watley added high-profile summer concerts including Grammy All-Stars in Chengdu, China at Chengdu Sports Centre and Essence Music Festival in July 2013.

Jody Watley released a new single "Nightlife", in 2013. The song, which marked a return to disco dance, was a Top 5 British Urban Single, Top 10 Commercial Pop Single Music Week and Billboard Hot Dance Club Play Top 20 Single in 2014.

2014–present: Paradise and Shalamar Reloaded
On July 28, 2014, the EP "Paradise" was released through Watley's longtime Avitone label, digital outlets and limited-edition CD exclusively through her official website the EP contains the single "Nightlife", along with 5 new songs and collaborations with Mark de Clive-Lowe, string arranger and musician Miguel Atwood Ferguson and newcomers Count de Money (France), Luminodisco (Italy) and Soulpersona (UK). Jody Watley collaborated with music new jack pop duo French Horn Rebellion.

Also in 2014, Watley, a well-documented original member of Shalamar, became the legally registered owner, although not without challenge. Watley would state that the term "Reloaded" was to make sure the public knew this was not a reunion with past members, and that she found the challenge exciting to rebrand the group, bringing it to a new generation while finally finding a way to bring both catalogues together for a dynamic concert experience. Watley also launched a new online boutique devoted to Shalamar merchandise, in tandem with her own longstanding Jody Watley Boutique, founded in 1999. A string of new American Tour Dates in support of Paradise and introducing the newly reloaded Shalamar included Oakland, Philadelphia, New York, Chicago, San Jose, Washington D.C. Sacramento, Atlantic City and more. media blitz to introduce the members that included television in major markets and concerts expanding in and outside of the United States and included Brazil, the Netherlands and the UK. The reloaded version of the group features renowned choreographer Rosero McCoy and newcomer Nate Allen Smith an Ohio native singer, dancer, choreographer Shalamar Reloaded released a promotional single titled "SlowDance" on July 17, 2015, through Watley's Avitone label. The single was subsequently picked up by independent label Spectra Music Group and released on October 20, 2015, along with a new video directed by Damien Sandoval. Jody Watley and the new trademarked Shalamar was also featured in a SIRIUSXM Special "In The Groove with B.K Kirkland which aired in July 2015. The SRL trio with Nate Smith and Rosero McCoy also made television appearances on Chicago's WGN Morning News debut performance and KTLA Morning New with Sam Rubin It was also announced that the ever eclectic Watley would be a guest vocalist on highly acclaimed funkster Dam-Funk's second album "Invite The Light" via Rolling Stone. Jody Watley and Shalamar Reloaded continue to add touring dates in the United States. They have also had festival appearances in the United Kingdom including Let's Rock London. Jody has also taken to Shalamar Reloaded to Japan, Brazil and Netherlands and added them to Superfreestyle arena dates in America as of 2015 and 2016 announcements. In 2016, Watley made the choice to redirect her efforts to the now formed Shalamar Reloaded, wanting a fresh start for her new group without the negativity and baggage. Shalamar Reloaded continue a quest to build a new base releasing their second single and video "O.R.I.G.IN.A.L" in May 2016, "The Mood" and continued adding a series of critically well-received concerts. In 2017, Shalamar Reloaded changed their name and all social media to a simple moniker of SRL in concerts and promotions with plans to release a debut album "Bridges". In 2017, Watley rebranded her music collective once again, opting for Jody Watley & SRL (Soul Revolution Love). All previous releases were removed from digital outlets and social media pages updated or removed completely. Re-releasing the song "The Mood" at the start of 2018 with a remix by Italian Producer Alex Di Cio "The Mood" became a Number 2 UK Soul Chart Single The follow-up "The Passion" also reached the UK Soul Chart Top 3. In the midst of that, Watley released the Bob Marley jazzy makeover of the classic "Waiting In Vain" making her first entry into Billboard magazine's Top 25 and Smooth Jazz Top 10.

Music and fashion legacy
In 1988, Watley filmed the video to "Looking for a New Love" and made a conscious decision to use fashion to help her express her vision, wearing clothes and accessories from designers such as Issey Miyake and Philip Treacy. In 1990, Watley would continue to be involved with fashion. On her second album, she was photographed by fashion photographer Steven Meisel, where she continued to make her own style statements. In the videos for "Real Love", Watley would introduce a higher fashion aesthetic blending vintage and custom designs. "Friends" mixed couture by Jean-Paul Gaultier, with an urban sensibility. She released a million-selling home video, Dance To Fitness. She was featured in the first celebrity ad campaign for Gap LA Eyeworks and in magazines such as Harper's Bazaar, Vogue, Vogue Italia, Rolling Stone, Essence and Vanity Fair. She was named one of the 50 Most Beautiful People of 1990 in People.

In the same year, she contributed a jazzy rendition of "After You, Who?" the compilation album "Red Hot + Blue", an AIDS-awareness charity recording of songs by Cole Porter produced by the Red Hot Organization. Watley was photographed by Victor Skrebneski, for the Saks Fifth Avenue Defining Style Fall Catalog, where she appeared in a 15-page high-fashion layout in 1996. In 2006, Watley would walk the runway with designer Kevan Hall for LA Fashion Week. The style icon is also noted as an influence on contemporary designer Malan Breton, contemporary A.Potts whose Spring/Summer 2021 collection was inspired by Watley and countless uncredited trends in contemporary style.

Influences
Her early music influences are Diana Ross, Marvin Gaye, Stevie Wonder, Michael Jackson, The Jackson 5, The Carpenters, Roberta Flack, Prince, Grace Jones and various jazz artists including Nancy Wilson.

Legacy
T-Boz of TLC cited Watley's song "Still a Thrill" as an example setting her vocal tone for her singing career. In a personal video, she sent to Watley (and was given permission to share on her YouTube channel) T-Boz thanked Watley for this song during her teenage years citing she was "hitting them notes" and helping her sing at a lower register to better suit her vocal range. Fellow TLC member Lisa Lopes was seen in a video pre-TLC dancing to Watley's song "Friends" which Watley acknowledged during one of her concerts.

Selena was influenced by Watley's song "Looking for a New Love" as the reason she wanted to crossover to the English-language market. Selena has also performed this song in concert which was notably documented in her Netflix bio-drama.
Jody Watley is an influencer who brought high fashion mixed with street style, along with her signature hoop earrings to the mainstream, fashion magazine features, ad campaigns, a million-selling fitness video, the first Black woman on the cover of a Japanese fashion magazine and a style of branding an image now common in the music industry.

Personal life and family
Watley has two children: a daughter, Lauren, with former fiancé and music producer Leon Sylvers III and a son Arie, with ex-husband André Cymone. She is the goddaughter of Jackie Wilson. Her younger sister is singer and former pornographic actress Michele Watley, better known as Midori.

Discography 

Studio albums
 Jody Watley (1987)
 Larger Than Life (1989)
 Affairs of the Heart (1991)
 Intimacy (1993)
 Affection (1995)
 Flower (1998)
 The Saturday Night Experience Volume 1 (1999)
 Midnight Lounge (2001)
 The Makeover (2006)

Tours
Larger Than Life Tour (1989)
The Intimate Tour (1993)
Colors of Christmas (2002)
Superfreestyle Freestyle Explosion (2015/2016)

Awards and nominations

Grammy Awards

|-
||  || "Dead Giveaway" ||  Best R&B Performance by a Duo or Group with Vocals || 
|-
|rowspan="2"|  || Herself || Best New Artist || 
|-
| "Looking for a New Love" || Best R&B Vocal Performance, Female || 
|-

American Music Awards

|-
||  || "Looking for a New Love" || Favorite Single (Soul/R&B) || 
|-

MTV Video Music Awards

|-
|rowspan="2"| 1988 
|rowspan="2"| "Some Kind of Lover" 
| Best Female Video 
|
|-
| Best New Artist in a Video 
|
|-
|rowspan="6"| 1989 
|rowspan="6"| "Real Love" 
| Best Female Video 
|
|-
| Best Dance Video
|
|-
| Breakthrough Video 
|
|-
| Best Direction in a Video
|
|-
| Best Art Direction in a Video 
|
|-
| Best Editing in a Video
|
|-

Soul Train Music Awards

|-
|rowspan="3"| 1988 
|rowspan="2"| "Looking for a New Love" 
| Best Music Video
| 
|-
| Best R&B/Soul Single, Female
| 
|-
| Jody Watley || Best R&B/Soul Album, Female 
| 
|-

Billboard Music Awards

|-
|| 2008 || Herself || Lifetime Achievement Award || 
|}

See also
 List of best-selling music artists
 List of Billboard number-one dance club songs
 List of artists who reached number one on the U.S. Dance Club Songs chart

References

External links

1959 births
African-American women singer-songwriters
American contraltos
American dance musicians
American female dancers
Dancers from Illinois
American house musicians
African-American record producers
Record producers from Illinois
American rhythm and blues singer-songwriters
American soul singers
Singers from Chicago
Midwest hip hop musicians
Grammy Award winners
Living people
Atlantic Records artists
MCA Records artists
Shalamar members
American women pop singers
American contemporary R&B singers
20th-century African-American women singers
21st-century African-American singers
American women record producers
American hip hop singers
American women hip hop singers
American women in electronic music
Singer-songwriters from Illinois